The Münchner Bank is a German credit union headquartered in Munich. Founded in 1862, it is the oldest and largest credit union in Bavaria with 525 employees at 41 locations and assets of 2.625 Billion Euros (c. 3700 Million US-Dollar). It functions as a bank providing payment-transaction and loan services to small businesses and personal customers.

References

External links
 official homepage

Cooperative banks of Germany
Financial services companies based in Munich
Investment banks
Banks established in 1862
1862 establishments in Bavaria
German companies established in 1862